Georgiy Aleksandrovich Ostrogorskiy (19 January 1902 – 24 October 1976), known in Serbian as Georgije Aleksandrovič Ostrogorski and English as George Alexandrovich Ostrogorsky, was a Russian-born Yugoslavian historian and Byzantinist who was widely known for his achievements in Byzantine studies. He was a professor at the University of Belgrade.

Early life and education

Ostrogorsky was born in Saint Petersburg, Russia Empire, the son of a secondary school principal and a writer on pedagogical subjects.

He completed his secondary education in a St. Petersburg classical gymnasium and thus acquired knowledge of Greek early in life. He began his university studies at the University of Heidelberg (1921), where he devoted himself initially to philosophy, economics, and sociology, though he also took classes in classical archaeology. His teachers included Karl Jaspers, Heinrich Rickert, Alfred Weber and Ludwig Curtius. His interest in history, especially Byzantine history, was awakened by Percy Ernst Schramm. After studying various aspects of Byzantinology in Paris (1924–25), Ostrogorsky received his doctorate from the University of Heidelberg (1927) with the dissertation The Rural Tax Community of the Byzantine Empire in the Tenth Century. He then taught as Privatdozent in Breslau from 1928 and moved to Belgrade in 1933. Ostrogorsky concerned himself with three main areas of research: economic, social, and institutional history with a focus on Byzantine peasantry, Byzantine theology, and imperial ideology, and Byzantine-Slavic relations, in particular in the Balkans.

Career
Ostrogorsky taught at the University of Belgrade's Faculty of Philosophy, where he was the chair for Byzantinology.

Ostrogorsky made the Kingdom of Yugoslavia his permanent home and taught at Belgrade for 40 years until his retirement in 1973, leaving the Chair for Byzantinology to Božidar Ferjančić. He was made a Corresponding Member of the Serbian Academy of Sciences and Arts in 1946 and a regular member two years later. An Institute of Byzantinology was created within the Academy in 1948 with himself as director, a post he held until his death

. He was chief editor of the Institute's house organ, the Zbornik radova Vizantološkog instituta, through its 16th volume which appeared in 1975. He also supervised the monograph series of the Institute of which the choice items were his own study Pronija (1951) and the multivolume collection of Byzantine Sources for the History of the Nations of Yugoslavia.

Ostrogorsky repaid in more than one way the hospitality he met with in his new country; he created a new generation of Yugoslav Byzantinists, broadened the horizons of Yugoslav historians by the example of his personal research, and provided for them closer contacts with the world scholarly community. Under his guidance, the Belgrade Institute became, along with Munich, Paris, and Dumbarton Oaks, a leading center of research in the field of Byzantinology. Ostrogorsky remained faithful to Belgrade to the very end, although over the years suggestions were made that he take up residence in an American or Soviet center of Byzantine studies.

His best-known work was the standard History of the Byzantine State, a work which saw three German editions (1940, 1952, 1963) and two editions in the English language (1st ed. 1956 (UK) and 1957 (USA), 2nd ed. 1968 (UK) and 1969 (USA)), and translations into more than 10 other languages.

Ostrogorsky died in Belgrade in 1976.

Selected works and editions
 
 
 
 
 
 
 
 
 
 
 Die ländliche Steuergemeinde des Byzantinischen Reiches im X. Jahrhundert, in: Vierteljahrschrift für Sozial- und Wirtschaftsgeschichte, Jg. 20 (1927), S. 1–108 [Dissertation] (Nachdruck 1969).
 Studien zur Geschichte des byzantinischen Bilderstreites. Breslau 1929 [Habilitation] (Nachdruck 1964).
 Geschichte des byzantinischen Staates. Handbuch der Altertumswissenschaft XII.1.2, C. H. Beck, München 1940, 3. Auflage 1963, . – Sonderausgabe ohne wissenschaftlichen Apparat unter dem Titel Byzantinische Geschichte 324 bis 1453, C. H. Beck, München 1965 (und Nachdrucke).

References

Sources

Soviet emigrants to Germany
German emigrants to Yugoslavia
Yugoslav historians
Yugoslav Byzantinists
Writers from Saint Petersburg
Heidelberg University alumni
Academic staff of the University of Belgrade
1902 births
1976 deaths
Corresponding Fellows of the Medieval Academy of America
Recipients of the Pour le Mérite (civil class)
Corresponding Fellows of the British Academy
Scholars of Byzantine history